Mansour Pourmirzaei (born September 21, 1980) is an Iranian Paralympic powerlifter who won a silver medal at the 2020 Tokyo Paralympics.

Major results

https://olympics.com/tokyo-2020/paralympic-games/en/results/powerlifting/athlete-profile-n1557408-pourmirzaei-mansour.htm

World Championships

2	+107 kg	2019	Nur-Sultan, KAZ	236.0

2	+107 kg	2017	Mexico City, MEX	241.0

2	+107 kg	2014	Dubai, UAE	265.0

Asian Para Games

2	+107 kg	2018	Jakarta, INA	248

References 

1980 births
Living people
Paralympic powerlifters of Iran
Powerlifters at the 2020 Summer Paralympics
Medalists at the 2020 Summer Paralympics